Ivybridge Rugby Club is an English rugby union club based in Ivybridge, Devon. The first XV team currently play in South West Premier, having reached the national levels of the sport for the first time in 2015 after two successive promotions, both via play-offs.

Honours
 Havill Plate winners: 1982
 Devon Junior Cup winners (4): 1988, 1989, 1991, 1995
 Devon Intermediate Cup winners: 2013
 Tribute Western Counties West champions (2): 1999–2000, 2013–14
 South West 1 (east v west) promotion play-off winner: 2014–15
 Devon Senior Cup winners: 2018

References

English rugby union teams
Rugby clubs established in 1979
Rugby union in Devon
Sports clubs in England
1970s establishments in England
Ivybridge